Mount Scott is a volcanic cinder cone with its summit in Clackamas County, Oregon. It is part of the Boring Lava Field, a zone of ancient volcanic activity in the area around Portland, and was named for Harvey W. Scott, a 19th and 20th century editor of The Oregonian newspaper. who owned  on the north and west slopes of the hill.

Mt. Scott was home to a "perpetual" cross burning by Oregon's Ku Klux Klan in the 1920s. Automotive parades of hooded Klan members were common in Southeast Portland.

The mountain is developed, with most of its southern flank within the city of Happy Valley, Oregon. The Willamette National Cemetery is located on the northeastern slope of the mountain, which is partially in Multnomah County.

References

External links 
 

Volcanoes of Oregon
Mountains of Oregon
Cinder cones of the United States
Extinct volcanoes
Volcanoes of Clackamas County, Oregon
Volcanoes of Multnomah County, Oregon
Mountains of Clackamas County, Oregon
Landforms of Multnomah County, Oregon
Pleistocene volcanoes